Lala Fazal-ur-Rehman was a former administrator of Karachi District, Sindh, Pakistan. Lala basically comes from northern area of Pakistan (Chitral).

See also
Karachi
Government of Karachi

References

External links 
 PPP, MQM reach consensus on administrators
 Sindh Local Govt Secretary Removed From Office

Living people
Politicians from Karachi
Year of birth missing (living people)